Nemanja Pejčinović (born 4 November 1987) is a Serbian former professional footballer who played as a centre-back.

A former Serbia U21 international, Pejčinović made three appearances for Serbia at full level between 2008 and 2016. In 2019, he was granted Russian citizenship.

Club career

Career in Serbia
Born in Kragujevac, Pejčinović started out at hometown club Radnički. He was snapped up by Rad in 2003, alongside Nenad Tomović. In the summer of 2005, Pejčinović was promoted to the first-team squad and given the number 33 shirt for the upcoming 2005–06 campaign. He made one league appearance during his first senior season, as the club suffered relegation to the second tier. In 2006, Pejčinović also captained the under-19 team that won the double (league and cup). He subsequently played 19 matches in the 2006–07 Serbian First League, helping the side reach the promotion playoffs.

In June 2007, Pejčinović was transferred to Serbian SuperLiga side OFK Beograd. He failed to make his official debut for the club, before being loaned back to Rad in February 2008. Until the end of the 2007–08 Serbian First League, Pejčinović scored once in 16 games and helped the club earn promotion to the top flight through the playoffs. He subsequently signed with Rad on a permanent basis. In the 2009 winter transfer window, Pejčinović joined Red Star Belgrade on loan until the end of the season.

Germany and France
In July 2009, Pejčinović was loaned to German side Hertha BSC with an option to buy. He made 25 appearances in all competitions, including 16 games in the Bundesliga, failing to help the club avoid relegation from the top flight. In July 2010, Pejčinović moved to France and joined Nice, initially on a season-long loan, which became a permanent deal in December of that year. He made 100 appearances and scored six times in Ligue 1 over the next four seasons. In June 2014, it was announced that Pejčinović would be leaving the club after his contract expires.

Russia and China

On 11 June 2014, Pejčinović signed a long-term contract with Russian club Lokomotiv Moscow. He was a regular member of the team that won the 2017–18 Russian Premier League, their first championship title after 14 years. Previously, Pejčinović won two Russian Cups (2014–15 and 2016–17).

In July 2018, Pejčinović signed for Chinese club Changchun Yatai on a free transfer. The club suffered relegation from the Chinese Super League at the end of the 2018 season.

In October 2020, Pejcinovic signed with Russian Football National League club Fakel Voronezh on a one-year contract. After his contract expired the following year, he signed another deal with the club on 31 August 2021, this time until June 2022.

International career

Serbia
Pejčinović represented Serbia at the 2009 UEFA European Under-21 Championship. He made his full international debut for Serbia on 14 December 2008, coming on as a substitute in a 1–0 friendly loss against Poland in Antalya, as the team was made up of mainly domestic-based players. In May 2014, Pejčinović received a call-up to the squad by caretaker Ljubinko Drulović ahead of Serbia's mini tour in the Americas, playing the full 90 minutes in a 2–1 win over Jamaica in Harrison, New Jersey.

Request to change teams
In April 2019, Pejčinović was granted Russian citizenship. In October 2020, he stated that since he had not been called up to the Serbia national team for three years, he wanted to request permission to be called up for the Russia national team.

Statistics

Club

International

Honours
Lokomotiv Moscow
 Russian Premier League: 2017–18
 Russian Cup: 2014–15, 2016–17
 Russian Super Cup: Runner-up 2015, 2017

References

External links

 
 
 
 

1987 births
Living people
Sportspeople from Kragujevac
Association football defenders
Bundesliga players
Changchun Yatai F.C. players
Chinese Super League players
Expatriate footballers in China
Expatriate footballers in France
Expatriate footballers in Germany
Expatriate footballers in Russia
FC Lokomotiv Moscow players
First League of Serbia and Montenegro players
FK Rad players
Hertha BSC players
Ligue 1 players
OFK Beograd players
OGC Nice players
Red Star Belgrade footballers
FC Fakel Voronezh players
Russian Premier League players
Serbia and Montenegro footballers
Serbia international footballers
Serbia under-21 international footballers
Serbian expatriate footballers
Serbian expatriate sportspeople in China
Serbian expatriate sportspeople in France
Serbian expatriate sportspeople in Germany
Serbian expatriate sportspeople in Russia
Naturalised citizens of Russia
Serbian First League players
Serbian footballers
Serbian SuperLiga players